Alice Hinda Lichtenstein is an American professor and researcher in nutrition and heart disease. In 2006, Shape magazine named Lichtenstein one of ten "Women Who Shaped the World". In 2019, Tamar Haspel called her a "grande dame of nutrition."

Education
Lichtenstein earned a B.S. in nutrition from Cornell University, M.S. in Nutrition from the Pennsylvania State University, and M.S. and D.Sc. in nutritional biochemistry from Harvard University. She completed her post-doctoral training at the Cardiovascular Institute, Boston University School of Medicine.

Positions
Lichtenstein is the Stanley N. Gershoff Professor of Nutrition Science and Policy at the Friedman School of Nutrition Science and Policy of Tufts University. She is also director and senior scientist of the Cardiovascular Nutrition Laboratory at the Jean Mayer USDA Human Nutrition Research Center on Aging, and professor of medicine at Tufts University School of Medicine.

Lichtenstein is currently a member of the Food and Nutrition Board (FNB) of the National Academy of Sciences. She served on multiple National Academy of Sciences committees, most recently the Review of Dietary Reference Intakes for Sodium and Potassium. She is executive editor of the Tufts Health and Nutrition Letter.

Research interests
Lichtenstein has spent her research career assessing the interplay between diet and heart disease risk factors. In her capacity as director of the Cardiovascular Nutrition Laboratory, Lichtenstein oversees research projects on a wide range of nutrition and cardiovascular disease related topics. Her research interests have included trans fatty acids; soy protein and isoflavones; sterol and stanol esters; modified vegetable oils with different fatty acid profiles, glycemic indexes and biomarkers of nutrient and food intake. Investigations have been conducted in animal models, cell systems, humans, and in population-based studies. Systematic review methods are also applied to the field of nutrition.

Diet guidelines for Americans
Lichtenstein was vice-chair of the 2015 Dietary Guidelines Advisory Committee (DGAC) of the U.S. Department of Agriculture and the U. S. Department of Health and Human Services. She also served on the 2000 Dietary Guidelines Advisory Committee. This committee develops a scientific report that informs the Dietary Guidelines for Americans.

Lichtenstein is the primary author of the American Heart Association's Diet and Lifestyle Recommendations, and served on the task forces on practice guidelines for the 2013 American Heart Association/American College of Cardiology's Guideline on the Treatment Of Blood Cholesterol to Reduce Atherosclerotic Cardiovascular Risk in Adults and Guideline on Lifestyle Management to Reduce Cardiovascular Risk.

Popular press
Lichtenstein is a frequent contributor to the media, which can sometimes struggle to report nutrition stories accurately when the science is preliminary. For example, she provided a cautionary note to The New York Times when a 2014 meta-analysis found that saturated fat was not implicated in heart disease. She told Anahad O'Connor that it would be unfortunate if the study resulted in people eating too much butter and cheese. NPR said she wrote a letter to the editor at The New York Times correcting Mark Bittman when he announced that "Butter Is Back" and that she cited a 2013 review by the American Heart Association that recommends limiting saturated fat. And she explained for The Washington Post that it would be a shame if people overconsumed grass-fed beef in the false hope that it contains a generous amount of omega-3 fatty acids when in fact it contains very little. She gave a summary of the 2015 scientific report for the U.S. dietary guidelines to Hari Sreenivasan for PBS Newshour.

Publications
Lichtenstein is the author of nearly four hundred peer-reviewed articles and numerous book chapters.

In 2005 she co-authored Strong Women, Strong Hearts with Miriam E. Nelson and Lawrence Lindner. She is associate editor of the Journal of Lipid Research.

Awards and honors
In 2018 Lichtenstein received the Alumni Award of Merit from Harvard T.H. Chan School of Public Health, and the Supelco Research Award from the American Oil Chemists Society, the first woman to receive the award since its inception in 1968. She received an Honorary Lifetime Membership Award in Recognition of Extraordinary Expertise and Contributions to Clinical Lipidology from the National Lipid Association, and was elected as a Fellow of the American Society for Nutrition. In 2019 she received the Conrad A. Elvehjem Award for Public Service in Nutrition from the American Society for Nutrition. She has numerous other awards dating back to the 1970s, including an honorary Ph.D. in 2005, from the University of Eastern Finland.

References

External links
 Alice H Lichtenstein - Tufts faculty directory
 PubMed - Lichtenstein+AH

Year of birth missing (living people)
Living people
American food scientists
Cornell University College of Human Ecology alumni
Pennsylvania State University College of Health and Human Development alumni
Harvard University alumni
Tufts University faculty